Bischheim is a commune in the Bas-Rhin department and Grand Est region of north-eastern France.

Geography
The town is bordered by Hoenheim, Strasbourg, Schiltigheim, and Niederhausbergen. It lies on the Ill and the canal between the Rhine and the Rhône (Rhône–Rhine Canal).

Population

See also
 Château de la Cour d'Angleterre
 Communes of the Bas-Rhin department

References

External links

 Official website 

Bas-Rhin communes articles needing translation from French Wikipedia
Communes of Bas-Rhin